Pachylaelaps karawaiewi is a species of mite in the family Pachylaelapidae. It is found in Europe.

References

Pachylaelapidae
Articles created by Qbugbot
Animals described in 1920